Minle is a town in Jinggu Dai and Yi Autonomous County, Yunnan, China. The town is known for Baijiu, white tea and Bletilla striata.

Administrative division
As of 2016, the town is divided into nine villages: 
 Baixiang
 Minle
 Mangzhuan
 Wengkong
 Dacun
 Dahebian
 Gahu
 Taozishu
 Xingmin

Geography
The town is situated at northwestern Jinggu Dai and Yi Autonomous County. The town shares a border with Yongping Town and Lincang to the southwest, Jinggu Town and Weiyuan Town to the southeast, and Zhenyuan Yi, Hani and Lahu Autonomous County to the north, and  Town to the south.

The highest point is Niujian Mountain, elevation .

The Minle River flows through the town.

Economy
The town's economy is based on nearby mineral resources and agricultural resources. The region mainly produce corn, rice, and potato. The region abounds with copper. Economic crops are mainly sugarcane, Bletilla striata, tobacco, white tea, coffee, and natural rubber. Baijiu production is also valuable to the local economy.

Demographics

As of 2020, the National Bureau of Statistics of China estimates the town's population now to be 26,423.

Transportation
The County Road J32 winds through the town.

References

Bibliography

Divisions of Jinggu Dai and Yi Autonomous County